Wyscout is an Italian company that supports football scouting, match analysis and transfer dynamics. The company was founded in Genoa, Italy in 2004, and it has been located in Chiavari since January 2008.

Wyscout provides video analysis tools and digital databases regarding performances and matches for football coaches, teams, and players. These tools give a detailed view of a large number of athletes’ individual performances, patterns of play, and tactical strategy.

History

2004–2010: Early years, B2B commercialization
During the years 2004–2010, the company business was about on demand Football Matches Analysis, WebTVs, Advertising, DVB-T TV broadcasting, and the Capello Index project.

In 2008, the Wyscout company, received capital for the business development from the local area (Chiavari) businessman Antonio Gozzi.

A very early version of the Wyscout Platform was released in March 2008. The company changed several names during the years 2004–2010 (Sport Video Service, Wisport, Wi, Wigroup, Wysport, WY, Wygroup) the final and current name of the company is Wyscout since May 2010.

2010–Present: Growth
In 2010 the company published a new major release of its main product, Wyscout Platform 2 (website and iOS versions); this was the release that made the product the visibility in the football scouting business now. In 2011, Wyscout organized the first Wyscout Forum, a football related event, in Milan, Italy.

In August 2012, former Italian Prime Minister Mario Monti said that Wyscout is "a good example of Italian Technological Company that made him remember what he saw during his past years in the Silicon Valley".

Since 2015 the style and the fonts of the Wyscout logo are used by the Wylab (a coworking space based in Chiavari, Italy) due an agreement; even if the two subjects are not related at all.

Products and services

Wyscout Platform

Early versions
The Wyscout Platform is a database containing information about footballers. It was published online in March 2008, with the name "Wiscout", and that version was called 0.1. The platform consisted in a website where it was possible to order DVDs via Express Courier and to browse the footballer stats as height, weight, etc.
In December 2008, the company started to provide standalone online HTML webpages with an embedded online video player to stream the football matches requested by their clients (Wiscout 0.2).
Wiscout Platform 0.3 was released and made accessible from Google Chrome in February 2009, there was the possibility to watch streamed football matches within the online platform, there was a small quantity of games available at the beginning.

Wiscout Platform
In Spring 2009, the company released Wiscout Platform 1.0 through customized Set-top boxes, it was possible to have access to the video database through an HDTV. In Spring 2010, the name of the product was changed in Wyscout Platform.

Wyscout Platform 2
It was published online as a website on March 5, 2010. The GUI of this version was very different from the previous one, displaying flags of all the nations in the home page, and the submenus displayed lists of all the leagues, teams, and players of the selected country.

Wyscout Platform 3
Wyscout Platform 3 was released on March 5, 2012, via website and as an iOS App.

Wyscout 4
Wyscout 4 is available as a website since June 2014.

Wyscout Forum
The Wyscout Forum is a B2B event where football agents, football clubs and players agencies deal together; it principally works as a hub of connection between them. The Wyscout Forum is generally held in the executive suites of football stadiums or hotels of global cities like London, Rio de Janeiro, Abu Dhabi, Barcelona, Moscow and Milan. The first Wyscout Forum took place in spring 2011. As of April 2014, there have been nine editions of the Wyscout Forum.

Reception
During the years 2012–2013, both The Guardian and The Independent wrote about the Wyscout Platform spending good words in reference to the dimensions of its database, The Guardian also praised the possibility to spot potential skilled footballers using the online platform.

References

External links
 Wyscout Official Site

Online services
Companies established in 2004
Sports management companies
Association football websites